Admiral Wells is a pub in the United Kingdom. Admiral Wells may also refer to:

David Wells (admiral) (1918–1983), Royal Australian Navy rear admiral
John Wells (Royal Navy officer) (1763–1841), British Royal Navy admiral
Lionel Wells (1884–1965), British Royal Navy admiral
Richard Wells (Royal Navy officer) (1833–1896), British Royal Navy admiral
Thomas Wells (Royal Navy officer) (1759–1811), British Royal Navy vice admiral